The Salyut programme (meaning "salute" or "fireworks") was the first space station programme, undertaken by the Soviet Union. It involved a series of four crewed scientific research space stations and two crewed military reconnaissance space stations over a period of 15 years, from 1971 to 1986. Two other Salyut launches failed. In one respect, Salyut had the task of carrying out long-term research into the problems of living in space and a variety of astronomical, biological and Earth-resources experiments, and on the other hand the USSR used this civilian programme as a cover for the highly secretive military Almaz stations, which flew under the Salyut designation. Salyut 1, the first station in the programme, became the world's first crewed space station.

Salyut flights broke several spaceflight records, including several mission-duration records, and achieved the first orbital handover of a space station from one crew to another, and various spacewalk records. The ensuing Soyuz programme was vital for evolving space station technology from a basic, engineering development stage, from single docking port stations to complex, multi-ported, long-term orbital outposts with impressive scientific capabilities, whose technological legacy continues . Experience gained from the Salyut stations paved the way for multimodular space stations such as Mir and the International Space Station (ISS), with each of those stations possessing a Salyut-derived core module at its heart.

Mir-2 (DOS-8), the final spacecraft from the Salyut series, became one of the first modules of the ISS. The first module of the ISS, the Russian-made Zarya, relied heavily on technologies developed in the Salyut programme.

History of Salyut space stations 

The programme was composed of  civilian stations and  military stations:

 The Almaz-OPS space station cores were designed in October 1964 by Vladimir Chelomey's NPO Mashinostroyeniya (OKB-52) organization as military space stations, long before the Salyut programme started. For Salyut, small modifications had to be made to the docking port of the OPS to accommodate Soyuz spacecraft in addition to TKS spacecraft.

 The civilian DOS space station cores were designed by Sergei Korolev's OKB-1 organisation. Korolev and Chelomey had been in fierce competition in the Soviet space industry during the time of the Soviet crewed lunar programme, but OKB-52's Almaz-OPS hull design was combined with subsystems derived from OKB-1's Soyuz. This was done beginning with conceptual work in August 1969. The DOS differed from the OPS modules in several aspects, including extra solar panels, front and (in Salyut 6 and 7) rear docking ports for Soyuz spacecraft and TKS spacecraft, and finally more docking ports in DOS-7 and DOS-8 to attach further space station modules.

It was realized that the later civilian DOS stations could not only offer a cover story for the military Almaz programme, but could also be finished within one year and at least a year earlier than Almaz. The Salyut programme begun on 15 February 1970 on the condition that the crewed lunar programme would not suffer. However, the engineers at OKB-1 perceived the L3 lunar lander effort as a dead-end and immediately switched to working on DOS. In the end it turned out that the Soviet N1 "Moon Shot" rocket never flew successfully, so OKB-1's decision to abandon the lunar programme and derive a DOS space station from existing Soyuz subsystems and an Almaz/OPS hull proved to be right: The actual time from the DOS station's inception to the launch of the first DOS-based Salyut 1 space station took only 16 months; the world's first space station was launched by the Soviet Union, two years before the American Skylab or the first Almaz/OPS station flew.

Initially, the space stations were to be named Zarya, the Russian word for "Dawn". However, as the launch of the first station in the programme was prepared, it was realised that this would conflict with the call sign Zarya of the RKA Mission Control Center (TsUP) in Korolyov – therefore the name of the space stations was changed to Salyut shortly before launch of Salyut 1. Another explanation given is that the name might have offended the Chinese, who purportedly were preparing a new rocket for launch, which they had already named Shuguang or "Dawn". The Salyut programme was managed by Kerim Kerimov, chairman of the state commission for Soyuz missions.

A total of nine space stations were launched in the Salyut programme, with six successfully hosting crews and setting some records along the way. However, it was the stations Salyut 6 and Salyut 7 that became the workhorses of the programme. Out of the total of 1,697 days of occupancy that all Salyut crews achieved, Salyut 6 and 7 accounted for 1,499. While Skylab already featured a second docking port, these two Salyut stations became the first that actually utilised two docking ports: this made it possible for two Soyuz spacecraft to dock at the same time for crew exchange of the station and for Progress spacecraft to resupply the station, allowing for the first time a continuous ("permanent") occupation of space stations.

The heritage of the Salyut programme continued to live on in the first multi-module space station Mir with the Mir Core Module ("DOS-7"), that accumulated 4,592 days of occupancy, and in the International Space Station (ISS) with the Zvezda module ("DOS-8"), that  accumulated 4,310 days of occupancy. Furthermore, the Functional Cargo Block space station modules were derived from the Almaz programme, with the Zarya ISS module being still in operation together with Zvezda.

First generation – The first space stations 
First generation served as a space station engineering test bed. Aim was from early Almaz beginnings to construct long-living multi-modular stations.

Salyut 1 (DOS-1)

DOS-2

Salyut 2 (OPS-1, military)

Kosmos 557 (DOS-3)

Salyut 3 (OPS-2, military) 

Salyut 3 would make history, by conducting the first test-fire of a conventional weapon in space. During Salyut 3’s mission span, cosmonauts would fire the onboard 23mm cannon, which was reported to be a modified Nudelman aircraft cannon. To operate the cannon, the crew had to maneuver the whole space station in the direction of the target. Sources state that the firing was to deplete the ammunition on the craft. However, others sources say that the station conducted 3 tests of the gun through the whole mission span of Salyut 3.

Salyut 4 (DOS-4)

Salyut 5 (OPS-3, military)

Second generation – Long-duration inhabitation of space 

In 1977, another marked step forward was made with the second generation of Salyut stations. The aim was to continuously occupy a space station with long-duration expeditions, for the first time in spaceflight.

Although Salyut 6 and Salyut 7 resembled the previous Salyut stations in overall design, several revolutionary changes were made to the stations and programme for the aim of continuous occupation. The new stations featured a longer design life and a second docking port at the aft of the stations – crew exchanges and station "handovers" were now made possible by docking two crewed Soyuz spacecraft at the same time. Furthermore, the uncrewed Progress resupply craft was created based on the crewed Soyuz, to resupply the crew and station with air, air regenerators, water, food, clothing, bedding, mail, propellants, pressurant, and other supplies. While the Progress docked to the station's second docking port, the crew's Soyuz spacecraft could remain docked to the station's first port. The Progress spacecraft even delivered hardware for updating onboard experiments and permitting repairs to the station, extending its life.

Salyut 6 (DOS-5)

Salyut 7 (DOS-6)

Salyut's heritage – Modular space stations 
After the second generation, plans for the next generation of Salyut stations called for the cores DOS-7 and DOS-8 to allow, for the first time in spaceflight, the addition of several modules to a station core and to create a modular space station. For this, the DOS modules were to be equipped with a total of four docking ports: one docking port at the aft of the station as in the second generation Salyuts, and the replacement of the front docking port with a "docking sphere" containing a front port and starboard docking port.

While the station cores DOS-7 and DOS-8 were built and flown, they never received the Salyut designation. Instead, DOS-7 evolved into the Mir Core Module for the Mir space station that followed the Salyut programme, and DOS-8 was used as the Zvezda Service Module for the International Space Station (ISS) which followed Mir.

The heritage from the Almaz programme is present even today. While the last space station from the Almaz programme was flown as Salyut 5 in 1976, the development of the Almaz TKS spacecraft evolved into the Functional Cargo Block, which formed the basis for several Mir modules, the experimental Polyus orbital weapons platform and the Zarya module of the ISS.

Mir Core Module (DOS-7) 

DOS-7 continued to be developed during Salyut 7, becoming the Mir Core Module of the Mir space station – the first modular space station, with crewed operations lasting from 1986 to 2000. The station featured upgraded computers and solar arrays, and accommodations for two cosmonauts each having their own cabin. A total of six docking ports were available on the Mir Core Module, which were used for space station modules and visiting spacecraft – the docking sphere design had been upgraded from its initial Salyut design to contain a maximum of five docking ports (front, port, starboard, zenith and nadir). And finally, the modules for Mir were derived from the Functional Cargo Block design of the Almaz programme.

The name of the Mir space station – , literally Peace or World – was to signify the intentions of the Soviet Union to bring peace to the world. However, it was during the time of Mir that the Soviet Union was dissolved in December 1991, ending what was begun with the 1917 October Revolution in Russia. This dissolution had started with the Soviet "perestroika and glasnost" ("restructuring and openness") reform campaigns by Soviet leader Mikhail Gorbachev in the 1980s, had reached a preliminary endpoint with the revolutions of 1989 and the end of the communist Eastern Bloc (Warsaw Pact and the Comecon), finally to reach the Soviet Union itself in 1991.

While the Russian Federation became the successor to much of the dissolved Soviet Union and was in a position to continue the Soviet space program with the Russian Federal Space Agency, it faced severe difficulties: imports and exports had steeply declined as the economic exchange with Comecon nations had crumbled away, leaving the industry of the former Soviet Union in shambles. Not only did the political change in eastern Europe signify an end of contributions to the space programme by eastern European nations (such as the East German Carl Zeiss Jena), but parts of the Soviet space industry were located in the newly independent Ukraine, which was similarly cash-strapped as Russia and started to demand hard currency for its contributions.

It was during this time of transition and upheaval that the Shuttle–Mir program was established between the Russian Federation and the United States in 1993. The former adversaries would now cooperate, with "Phase One" consisting of joint missions and flights of the United States Space Shuttle to the Mir space station. It was a partnership with stark contrasts – Russia needed an inflow of hard currency to keep their space programme aloft, while in the United States it was seen as a chance to learn from the over 20 years of experience of Soviet space station operations. It was "Phase Two" of this Shuttle–Mir program that would lead to the International Space Station.

Zvezda ISS Service Module (DOS-8) 

DOS-8 evolved into the Mir-2 project, intended to replace Mir. Finally, it became the International Space Station (ISS) Zvezda Service Module and formed the core of the early ISS together with the Zarya module (which was derived from Almaz Functional Cargo Block designs).

Data table 
The first generation of Salyut stations received few craft for rendezvous and docking. By contrast the programme's second generation stations, Salyut 6 and Salyut 7, received multiple crewed and uncrewed craft for rendezvous, docking attempts (whether successful or not), human habitation, crew transfer, and supply. The table counts craft which achieved rendezvous with their targets as visiting craft, regardless of whether they docked successfully.

All data for Zvezda (DOS-8) .

See also 

 List of human spaceflights to Salyut space stations
 List of Salyut expeditions
 List of Salyut visitors
 List of Salyut spacewalks
 List of uncrewed spaceflights to Salyut space stations

References

External links 

 

 

 "Diaries of the Salyut missions" at Zarya.info

 "Skylab-Salyut Space Laboratory (1972)" at Wired.com

1971 in spaceflight
1973 in spaceflight